Kelly Kaduce (born 1974) is an American soprano. She was born in Winnebago, Minnesota, United States of America. A graduate of St. Olaf College and Boston University (where she studied under Penelope Bitzas), Kaduce won the 1999 Metropolitan Opera National Council Auditions.

Career
Since her debut in 2000, she has appeared in national and international opera houses (e.g., New York City Opera, Boston Lyric Opera, Opera Theater of St. Louis).

Kaduce sang the title role of Anna Karenina in the world premiere of the David Carlson opera in 2007 (Florida Grand Opera and Opera Theater of St. Louis), directed by Colin Graham. She also starred in the world premiere production of Ian Gordon's The Grapes of Wrath (Minnesota Opera), Bright Sheng's Madame Mao (Santa Fe Opera debut in 2003), and the American premieres of Tan Dun's Tea: A Mirror of Soul (Santa Fe Opera) and Michael Berkeley's Jane Eyre (Opera Theater of St. Louis). She created the role of Caroline Gaines in Richard Danielpour's Margaret Garner in Detroit. Kaduce has also appeared as Mimi in Baz Luhrmann's Broadway La Boheme in Los Angeles. She opened the Santa Fe Opera 2010 season as Madama Butterfly.

Repertoire
Kaduce's repertoire includes Donna Anna and Donna Elvira (Mozart's Don Giovanni), Violetta (Verdi's La Traviata), Mimi and Musetta (Puccini's La Boheme), Nedda (I Pagliacci), Wendy Torrance (The Shining), Juliette (Gounod's Romeo et Juliette), the title roles in Suor Angelica, Rusalka, Susannah, Jenufa, Thais, and Richard Strauss's Salome. Her concert repertoire includes Samuel Barber's Prayers of Kierkegaard, Alban Berg'sSeven Early Songs, Richard Strauss's Vier letzte Lieder, and Benjamin Britten's War Requiem.

Family life
Kaduce is married to baritone Lee Gregory.

Discography 
 Carlson, Anna Karenina, Robertson.
 Gordon, The Grapes of Wrath, Minnesota Opera.

External links
 Official Site
  Opera News, June 2008
  Anna Karenina
 A Small Town Girl with a Big Voice
 Kelly Kaduce sings Anna Karenina
 Santa Fe 2010
 The Classical Review: Soprano’s unhinged intensity proves overwhelming in Santa Fe Opera’s “Butterfly”
 Miami Herald
 Kelly Kaduce shines in Sommerfest's 'Madame Butterfly': Soprano Kelly Kaduce was superb in Puccini opera's title role. (Minnesota Orchestra) (08/03/2015)

Living people
1974 births
American operatic sopranos
Singers from Minnesota
St. Olaf College alumni
Boston University College of Fine Arts alumni
People from Faribault County, Minnesota
Winners of the Metropolitan Opera National Council Auditions
20th-century American women  opera singers
21st-century American women opera singers
Classical musicians from Minnesota